China Digital Times (CDT) is a US-based 501(c)(3) organization that runs a bilingual news website covering China. The site focuses on news items which are blocked, deleted or suppressed by China's state censors.

History
The website was started by Xiao Qiang at the Graduate School of Journalism at the University of California, Berkeley, in the fall of 2003. Xiao has asserted that Chinese internet users are using digital tools to create new autonomous forms of political expression and dissent, "changing the rules of the game between state and society".

According to Freedom House, researchers at China Digital Times have reportedly identified over 800 filtered terms, including "Cultural Revolution" and "propaganda department". The types of words, phrases and web addresses censored by the government include names of Chinese high level leadership; protest and dissident movements; politically sensitive events, places and people; and foreign websites and organizations blocked at network level, along with pornography and other content. 

For many years, the site has leaked propaganda from the State Council Information Office, which overseers news websites in China.

The site also publishes the Grass-Mud Horse Lexicon, a wiki-based directory of Chinese Internet language. The project is named after the Grass Mud Horse (cǎo ní mǎ), a pun on the phrase cào nǐ mā, literally, "fuck your mother", and which is one of the Baidu 10 Mythical Creatures. The publication has also covered the backlash against increased censorship from China's independent media, and employees of state media.

In 2009, it published a set of documents leaked by a Baidu employee which revealed events, people and places that were deemed politically sensitive.

In 2013, China Digital Times published an English-language e-book, Decoding the Chinese Internet: A Glossary of Political Slang, which contains Chinese Internet language that criticizes the government.

Staff and operations
Sophie Beach is the Executive Editor of its English site, and her writing about China has appeared in publications including the Los Angeles Times, the Asian Wall Street Journal, the South China Morning Post and The Nation magazine. The Translations Editor is Anne Henochowicz, an alumna of the Penn Kemble Democracy Forum Fellowship at the National Endowment for Democracy. She has written for other publications including Foreign Policy, The China Beat, and the Cairo Review of Global Affairs.

China Digital Times provides content about China for The World Post, a partnership between The Huffington Post and the Berggruen Institute. The China Digital Times website is run by students of the university, with help from contributors from around the world. China Digital Times has been a recipient of funding from the National Endowment for Democracy.

Response by the Chinese government

The China Digital Times website has been blocked in mainland China since 2006 and in response, Xiao launched a Chinese-language site in 2011. That site has since also been blocked, but numerous methods are used to ensure the site remains accessible in China – including email lists, social media and mirror sites.

A popular section on the site is 'Minitrue', which is short for 'Ministry of Truth', a reference to the Ministry of Truth in George Orwell's novel Nineteen Eighty-Four. It makes a point of highlighting official government directives to media organizations, requiring them to censor or remove postings on sensitive matters. Conversely, if a particular news event is favorable to the government,  a directive will sometimes be issued that insists that this be "prominently displayed" on the home pages of online news sites.

References

External links
 

Year of establishment missing
Chinese-language websites
American news websites
501(c)(3) organizations
Non-profit organizations based in the San Francisco Bay Area
Internet censorship in China